Guey Heung Lee v. Johnson, 404 U.S. 1215 (1971), was a United States Supreme Court case regarding the desegregation of schools in San Francisco.

In 1971, the San Francisco Unified School District attempted to desegregate the school system by reassigning pupils attending segregated schools to other public schools. The School District submitted a comprehensive plan for desegregation which the District Court approved.

Some Chinese parents protested the move, because in the Asian schools the students could learn about their cultural heritage, and they would lose this if they went to public schools.

The Court of Appeals for the Ninth Circuit entered a temporary stay pending a hearing in the District Court. Four days later, however, the Court of Appeals vacated that stay sua sponte. The District Court then denied the stay. Thereupon, a different three-judge panel of the Court of Appeals heard oral argument on the motions for a stay and denied those motions.

The Supreme Court too denied the stay, saying

See also
 List of United States Supreme Court cases, volume 404
 Brown v. Board of Education of Topeka (1954)

References

External links
 

United States Supreme Court cases
United States equal protection case law
United States education case law
United States racial desegregation case law
Public education in California
School segregation in the United States
1971 in United States case law
1971 in education
United States Supreme Court cases of the Burger Court
Asian-American issues